Shelby Walker (27 February 1975 – 24 September 2006) was an American professional boxer and mixed martial artist. Walker, also known as Shelby Girl, was born as Shelby Rogers.

Combat career

After five years in active duty and in the reserve of the US Army, Walker began her career as a mixed martial artist. Of her six MMA bouts, she won three and lost three.

In 2002, Walker became a professional boxer. In her boxing career, she completed 14 bouts. She won seven (six of them by K.O.), lost six and reached a draw.

Shelby Walker was originally supposed to fight Erica Montoya at UFC 51, if it occurred it would have been the first female MMA bout in the UFC.  The fight never materialised, "Big Dog" Benny Henderson Jr. asked Shelby Walker, "It has been rumored that you may fight Erika Montoya at UFC 51, is there any truth to those rumors?" Walker replied, "Yeah there is truth to those rumors, it has been talked about a lot and when I asked Dana White if he was going to put us on the show he said possibly, so that is where
it stands right now. I haven’t heard anything more from this but my biggest dream would be to fight in the UFC."

Professional boxing record

Mixed martial arts record

|-
|Loss
|align=center|2–3
|Adrienna Jenkins
|Submission (rear-naked choke)
|HOOKnSHOOT Evolution 2
|
|align=center|1
|align=center|1:27
|Evansville, Indiana, United States
|
|-
|Win
|align=center|2–2
|Beth Westover
|Decision (unanimous)
|Absolute Fighting Championships 4
|
|align=center|2
|align=center|5:00
|Fort Lauderdale, Florida, United States
|
|-
|Win
|align=center|1–2
|Angela Wilson
|TKO (punches)
|USMMA 3: Ring of Fury
|
|align=center|1
|align=center|0:05
|Boston, Massachusetts, United States
|
|-
|Loss
|align=center|0–2
|Tara LaRosa
|Submission (punches)
|HOOKnSHOOT Revolution
|
|align=center|1
|align=center|2:43
|Evansville, Indiana, United States
|
|-
|Loss
|align=center|0–1
|Judy Neff
|Submission (armbar)
|HOOKnSHOOT Kings 1
|
|align=center|1
|align=center|0:40
|Evansville, Indiana, United States
|
|-
|}

References

External links
 
 

1975 births
2006 deaths
Lightweight boxers
People from Kingsville, Texas
American female mixed martial artists
Flyweight mixed martial artists
Mixed martial artists utilizing boxing
Mixed martial artists from Texas
American women boxers
Boxers from Texas
Drug-related deaths in Florida
Featherweight boxers
20th-century American women
21st-century American women